The Healing Process is the second studio album by the Canadian deathcore band Despised Icon. It was released on April 5, 2005 through Century Media Records.

Track listing
All songs written by Alex Erian and Eric Jarrin, except where noted.

Personnel
Despised Icon
Alex Erian – vocals
Steve Marois – vocals
Eric Jarrin – guitar
Yannick St-Amand – guitar
Sebastien Piché – bass
Alex Pelletier – drums

Production
Produced by Yannick St-Amand

References

2005 albums
Despised Icon albums
Century Media Records albums